Moritz Hörnes (July 14, 1815 – November 4, 1868) was an Austrian palaeontologist.

Born in Vienna, he was educated at the University of Vienna and graduated with a PhD. He then became an assistant in the Vienna mineralogical museum. He was distinguished for his research on the Cenozoic Mollusca of the Vienna Basin and of Alpine regions. Most of his memoirs were published in the Jahrbuch der K. K. geol. Reichsanstalt.

In 1864 he introduced the term Neogene to include Miocene and Pliocene, as these formations are not always to be clearly separated: the fauna of the lower division being subtropical and gradually giving place in the upper division to Mediterranean forms. He died in Vienna on 4 November 1868.

In 1860 the mineral hörnesite was named in his honor by Wilhelm Haidinger, with Gustav Adolph Kenngott being its co-describer.

The Florentine Diamond was properly weighed and documented and a plaster copy made of it under his supervision.

His son Dr. Rudolf Hörnes (1850–1912), professor of geology and palaeontology in the University of Graz, also carried on researches among the Cenozoic mollusca, and is author of Elemente der Palaeontologie (1884).

References
 

1815 births
1868 deaths
Austrian paleontologists